Captain Zero may refer to:

 Captain Zero (magazine), a pulp magazine
 Captain Zero, a character in Tugs (TV series)

See also
 Captain Z-Ro
 Captain Hero
 Captain Nero